David Neuhaus or David Mark Neuhaus SJ (born 25 April 1962 in Johannesburg, South Africa) is an Israeli Jesuit from German descent and the superior of the Jesuit community of the house of the Pontifical Biblical Institute in Jerusalem. Previously, from 2009 to 2017, he assumed the office of Patriarchal Vicar for Hebrew-speaking Catholics in the Latin Patriarchate of Jerusalem.

Life
David Neuhaus, son of German Jews, was born in South Africa. At the age of 15, he moved to Israel; at 26 years, he converted to the Roman Catholic faith. Neuhaus finished his studies in political science at the Hebrew University of Jerusalem with a doctorate. In 1992 he joined the Society of Jesus (SJ) and on August 20, 1994 made his perpetual vows. After his theological and philosophical training and study of theology and Scripture at the Jesuit Centre Sèvres in Paris and the Pontifical Biblical Institute in Rome, Neuhaus received on 8 September 2000 his priestly ordination. Since 2001 he teaches at Bethlehem University the subjects "Introduction to Judaism" and "Introduction to the Old Testament" and Biblical Studies, at the Studium Theologicum Salesianum in Jerusalem, and at the Latin Patriarchate Seminary in Beit Jala. He was a Research Fellow at the Jewish Shalom Hartman Institute in Jerusalem.

On March 15, 2009 David Neuhaus was appointed by the Latin Patriarch of Jerusalem, Fouad Twal, Patriarchal Vicar for the Hebrew-speaking Catholics. A year later, he was appointed Coordinator of the Coordination for the Pastoral Among Migrants.

In August 2017 he asked Archbishop Pierbattista Pizzaballa to relieve him of his charge as vicar.

Father Rafic Nahra succeeded him in October 2017.

Sources

 Justice and the Intifada: Palestinians and Israelis Speak Out, Friendship Press 1991, along with Ghassan Rubeiz and Kathy Bergen.
 Critical solidarity: some reflections on the role of privileged Christians in the struggle of the dispossessed, Cultural Association Aphorism Trier 1995, .
 Land, Bible and History, Cultural Association Aphorism Trier 2011, along with Alain Marchadour, AA.

References

External links
 http://www.catholic.co.il/index.php?lang=en
 http://www.biblico.it/doc-vari/neuhaus_ing.html
 http://www.haaretz.com/israel-news/an-unorthodox-aliyah-1.284722
 http://www.ignatianspirituality.com/4344/david-neuhaus-sj
 http://en.lpj.org/vicars/vicar-for-hebrew-speaking/

1962 births
Living people
20th-century Jesuits
21st-century Jesuits
Academic staff of Bethlehem University
Converts to Roman Catholicism from Judaism
Hebrew University of Jerusalem Faculty of Social Sciences alumni
Pontifical Biblical Institute alumni
Israeli Jesuits
Clergy from Johannesburg
South African emigrants to Israel
South African people of German-Jewish descent